True Live is an Australian band formed in Melbourne, Australia. They had chart success with "TV" reaching #76 on the ARIA Single Chart and The Shape of It reaching #85 on the ARIA Albums Chart. The group received regular play on radio and television and were chosen to perform at the 2006 Commonwealth Games. The group's early recordings contained strong ties to hip hop but in 2011 have made a significant turn toward rock and classical leanings.

History
True Live was formed in 2003, consisting of 6 diverse musicians. Under the leadership of Ryan Ritchie the band began to play gigs around Melbourne, including regular performances at The Evelyn and Revolver. During this time the group established its recognisable style, including a complete string section.

In 2005 True Live signed with Shock Records and released its debut release, Mintons EP. The album was critically acclaimed, and received extensive play on Triple J, the video clip being played regularly on Rage, Channel V and Video Hits. Subsequent songs from the record, such as 'Bounce', received similar coverage. During the 2005–2006 period the band toured, performing at the Meredith Music Festival, the Bangalow Jazz Festival and Big Day Out among others, performing with acts such as Moby, Roots Manuva and De La Soul. In October 2006 the band released its second release "The Shape of it", the lead single 'TV' receiving being played on a range of commercial stations across Australia, including Nova and The Edge and its accompanying video clip appearing on major music programs.

In 2005 Ryan Ritchie and True Live created the musical soundtrack for RASH the first feature-length documentary in Australia to focus on the new art form of street art.

In early 2007, True Live received four stars in Rolling Stone Magazine for their album and succeeded in selling out tours across Australia. In 2007 'TV' was used as the music in the Fox Sports advertisements and in 2008 'Let Out' was included in the TV mini series 'Underbelly'. In May 2008, True Live released 'The Shape of It' in Japan.

The band has now released its 2nd album 'Found Lost'. In early 2009 True Live signed to Melbourne record label Illusive Sounds who are also the home of Bliss N Eso & Paris Wells. 'Found Lost' though critically successful, was a sales disaster in Australia, however the single 'Something To Be' received attention in France on both Radio and Television and the album was released and sold well in France and Switzerland, in 2011 the group Signed to Sakifo Records out of Orleans France, and are set to release their 3rd album through Europe in 2014.

Touring

True Live have supported international touring artists such as DJ Shadow, The Roots, De La Soul, Roots Manuva, Moby and Ozomatli on Australia-wide tours, and have
been a successful part of a number of festivals, including:
The Big Day Out – (V Stage) Melbourne 2005
Pyramid Rock – Main Stage, Phillip Island 2004, 2006, 2007
Darling Harbour Jazz Festival - 2007
Meredith Music festival – 2004, 2005
We Love Sounds Festival – Opening for DJ Shadow Brisbane 2007
Woodford Folk Festival – Main Stage 2005/2006, 2008/2009
MS Fest '06 – Launceston 2006
Make Poverty History – Geelong/Perth 2007
Southbound - Bussleton 2006
The Falls Festival –Marion Bay, Lorne 2005/2006
The Feelgood Festival – Luna Park, Sydney 2006
The Great Escape – Sydney 2006, 2007
The Commonwealth Games – Melbourne 2006
Groovin' The Moo – Maitland, Albury, Darwin 2006, 2007
The West Coast Blues and Roots Festival – Fremantle 2007
East Coast Blues and Roots Festival - 2008
Kiss My Grass Festival – Melbourne 2007
Rip Curl Pro World Championship Tour – 2005, 2006
St Kilda Festival – 2004, 2005, 2008
BBQ Breaks – Brisbane 2007
Sound Safari - Melbourne - 2010
Musiques en stock - Cluses - 2011
Sakifo Music Festival - Reunion - 2010
Festival de La Cité at Lausanne - Switzerland - 2011
Fun Festival - Beijing - 2012

Music
True Live combines classical jazz, soul, hip hop and dance music. The group incorporates violin, keyboard, cello, drums and double bass in live performance.

Discography

Albums

Singles

References

Australian hip hop groups
Australian jazz ensembles
Jazz fusion ensembles
Musical groups established in 2003